Portmellon is a coastal settlement in south Cornwall, England, United Kingdom. It is one mile south of Mevagissey and six miles south of St Austell.

Portmellon lies within the Cornwall Area of Outstanding Natural Beauty (AONB). Almost a third of Cornwall has AONB designation, with the same status and protection as a National Park.

The sandy beach at Portmellon is safe for bathing and there is a public slipway for launching boats. Portmellon has a long history of building boats with many wooden–hulled boats leaving the workshop over the years, including Denis Hame's 20-footer named Vivian.

The sandy beach is set in a small cove, a 20-minute walk from Mevagissey. The beach is around 150 metres long but is completely covered at high tide. At low tide rock pools are exposed and on some occasions seals can be seen swimming off the beach or resting on the rocks.

References

External links

Villages in Cornwall